Sinem Saban is an Australian film writer, producer, director, and human rights activist.  She is best known for directing and producing the film Our Generation.

Biography
Saban was born to Turkish Cypriot parents who emigrated to Australia in the early 1970s. She studied Media, Aboriginal and Legal Studies at RMIT University and at La Trobe University in Melbourne whilst volunteering at her local Aboriginal culture centre in Geelong, Victoria. In 2000, her interest to find out more about traditional Aboriginal culture led her to move to Darwin where she completed her Secondary Teaching education at Charles Darwin University. In 2004, she was invited to join musician Michael Franti to film and document the human cost of war in Iraq, Palestine and Israel for his film I Know I'm Not Alone. Upon returning to Australia, she continued teaching in the Yirrkala, Maningrida and Galiwin'ku communities and follow her passion for Indigenous rights. In her spare time, Saban was invited to film and take photographs of Yolngu life, hunting, ceremonies and stories. With the Northern Territory Intervention in 2007, Saban embarked on the making "Our Generation".

Filmography

References

External links

Living people
Australian people of Turkish Cypriot descent
Australian film directors
Australian women film directors
Australian film producers
Australian human rights activists
Women human rights activists
Year of birth missing (living people)